Romano Rodrigues (born November 10, 1987) is a Brazilian footballer who plays for San Marcos de Arica, as a left back for Veranópolis.

Career
Romano started his career at Esportivo. The player also had spells at some Rio Grande do Sul clubs, mostly recognized at Veranópolis (2009/10). After his spell at Veranópolis, Romano signed with Portuguesa. After a successful half-season with Lusa, Romano was loaned to Série A club Avaí, in a one-year deal. On 4 January 2012, Romano signed a one-year deal with newly relegated Série B outfit Ceará and in May, moved to Joinville on a loan deal.

Career statistics
(Correct )

References

External links
 

1987 births
Living people
Brazilian footballers
Brazilian expatriate footballers
Esporte Clube Juventude players
Associação Portuguesa de Desportos players
Avaí FC players
Ceará Sporting Club players
Joinville Esporte Clube players
Agremiação Sportiva Arapiraquense players
San Marcos de Arica footballers
Chilean Primera División players
Campeonato Brasileiro Série A players
Expatriate footballers in Chile
Association football defenders